Pierson is an unincorporated community recognized as a local urban district located in the Municipality of Two Borders in southwestern Manitoba, Canada.  The  Antler–Lyleton Border Crossing is located south of Pierson.

Pierson is home to the Carnival of Crafts which averages an attendance of 1,700 people. This event takes place at the Edward Sports Centre on the first Saturday in October.

Demographics 

Climate
Pierson has a humid continental climate (Dfb) with great differences between summer and winter. The regime is typical of southern Manitoba, the northern edges of North Dakota and the surrounding border region.

External links
 Official Web site for Pierson, Manitoba

References

Designated places in Manitoba
Local urban districts in Manitoba
Unincorporated communities in Westman Region